Monterey Market is an independent produce and grocery store in Berkeley, California. They maintain an extensive produce section, sourcing from local providers. The store is frequented by many of the local restaurants, such as Paul Bertolli's Oliveto, for their selection of hard to find heirloom and specialty fruits, vegetables and fungi. The store was begun in 1961 by Tom and Mary Fujimoto.

References

Eat At Bill's: Life in the Monterey Market, documentary on the market by Lisa Brenneis

External links
Monterey Market website

Retail companies established in 1961
1961 establishments in California
Food and drink in the San Francisco Bay Area
Companies based in Berkeley, California
Food retailers of the United States
Supermarkets based in California